Laughing was the first release by Australian alternative country musician Anne McCue.  It was released in 1996. This independent release received limited airplay on the Australian airwaves via ABC's Radio National and 'Always' appeared in the Aussie indie film 'This Space Between Us' (this info courtesy www.girlmonstar.com).

Track listing

 "Waiting for the Sun"
 "Always"
 "My Only One"
 "Laughing"
 "Angeline"
 "These Things"

1996 EPs
Anne McCue albums